Kodur, Koduru or Kodoor may refer to:

India

Andhra Pradesh 
 B. Kodur, a village in YSR district, Andhra Pradesh, India
 Koduru, Krishna district a village in Krishna district, Andhra Pradesh, India
 Railway Koduru, a village in Annamayya district, Andhra Pradesh, India
 Koduru, Vizianagaram district, a village in Vizianagaram district, Andhra Pradesh, India
 Kodur (Assembly constituency)

Kerala 
 Kodur, Malappuram, a village in Malappuram district, Kerala, India
 Kodoor River, a river in Kerala

Telangana 
 Chinna Kodur, a village in Medak district, Telangana, India
 Kodur, Pulkal, a village in Pulkal mandal, Medak district, Telangana, India

Iran
 Kodur-e Bala, a village in Kerman Province
 Kodur-e Pain, a village in Kerman Province